Kung Fu Panda is a media franchise produced by DreamWorks Animation.

Kung Fu Panda may also refer to:
 Kung Fu Panda (film)
 Kung Fu Panda 2, the 2nd film in the franchise
 Kung Fu Panda 3, the 3rd film in the franchise
 Kung Fu Panda (video game)
 Kung Fu Panda 2 (video game)

See also
 Kung Fu (disambiguation)
 Pablo Sandoval, a Venezuelan baseball player nicknamed "Kung Fu Panda"